In astrodynamics, the patched conic approximation or patched two-body approximation is a method to simplify trajectory calculations for spacecraft in a multiple-body environment.

Method

The simplification is achieved by dividing space into various parts by assigning each of the n bodies (e.g. the Sun, planets, moons) its own sphere of influence. When the spacecraft is within the sphere of influence of a smaller body, only the gravitational force between the spacecraft and that smaller body is considered, otherwise the gravitational force between the spacecraft and the larger body is used. This reduces a complicated n-body problem to multiple two-body problems, for which the solutions are the well-known conic sections of the Kepler orbits.

Although this method gives a good approximation of trajectories for interplanetary spacecraft missions, there are missions for which this approximation does not provide sufficiently accurate results. Notably, it does not model Lagrangian points.

Example

On an Earth-to-Mars transfer, a hyperbolic trajectory is required to escape from Earth's gravity well, then an elliptic or hyperbolic trajectory in the Sun's sphere of influence is required to transfer from Earth's sphere of influence to that of Mars, etc. By patching these conic sections together—matching the position and velocity vectors between segments—the appropriate mission trajectory can be found.

See also

 Two-body problem
 N-body problem
 Sphere of influence
 Kerbal Space Program, a popular simulator based on the patched conic approximation

References

Bibliography
 

Astrodynamics